Ten Silver Drops is the second full-length album by the American rock band The Secret Machines. It was released exclusively through the iTunes Music Store on February 28, 2006, while the street date for the CD was April 25, 2006. The first single from the album, "Alone, Jealous and Stoned", was released in the United Kingdom on January 16, 2006, and in the US shortly thereafter. On January 29, 2006, Ten Silver Drops leaked onto file sharing websites following the release of the album's lead single in the UK.

The album reached No. 43 on the UK Albums Chart. In the US, the album reached No. 159 on the Billboard 200.

Track listing
All tracks written by Secret Machines.
"Alone, Jealous and Stoned" – 6:46
"All at Once (It's Not Important)" – 4:37
"Lightning Blue Eyes" – 5:31
"Daddy's in the Doldrums" – 8:23
"I Hate Pretending" – 5:15
"Faded Lines" – 4:59
"I Want to Know if It's Still Possible" – 5:00
"1,000 Seconds" – 5:15

Personnel 
 Brandon Curtis – vocals, bass guitar, keyboards
 Benjamin Curtis – guitar, backing vocals
 Josh Garza – drums
with:
Alejandra Deheza – vocals on "Faded Lines"
Garth Hudson – accordion on "I Want to Know if It's Still Possible"

Run Out Groove Vinyl Reissue

On September 10, 2018, the label announced that the band's album Ten Silver Drops had been voted by fans as the next ROG re-release and would include a 6-song bonus disc containing B-sides and unreleased alternate versions of songs.

Expanded edition Bonus Tracks:

 Daddy's in the Doldrums (previously unreleased alternate version) 8:00
 Another Minute Standing Still (non-LP track from “Lightning Blue Eyes” UK single) 5:19
 Everything is Free (non-LP track from “All At Once (It’s Not Important)” UK single) 4:13
 Solar Bloodlines (non-LP instrumental track from “Lightning Blue Eyes” UK single) 6:15
 I Want To Know If It's Still Possible (previously unreleased alternate acoustic version) 4:55
 Angel in Love With Her Own Wings (non-LP track from “All At Once (It’s Not Important)” UK single ) 9:37

References

External links
 Billboard.com
Secret Machines official website
The Secret Machines talk about the new album

2006 albums
Secret Machines albums